Willett may refer to:

People
Willett (name)

Places

Municipalities
Willett (Columbus, Georgia), neighborhood in Columbus, Georgia
Willett, South Dakota, a ghost town
Willett, hamlet of Elworthy, England

Geographic features
Willett Cove, cove in Antarctica, named for James H. Willett of the Navy Hydrographic Office
Willett Range, Antarctic range named for R.W. Willett, Director of the New Zealand Geological Survey
Willett Hot Springs, hot springs site north of Ojai, California

Buildings
Robert E. Willett Elementary School in Davis, California
Willett Hall, a multipurpose arena in Farmville, Virginia
Willett House, in Lisbon, Arkansas

Other uses
USS Kenneth M. Willett (DE-354), U.S. Navy destroyer escort used during World War II
Willett Distillery, producer of various whiskey brands including Willett Pot Still Reserve and Willett Family Estate bourbon whiskey

See also
Willetts, surname
Willet (disambiguation)